Stilbosis antibathra is a moth in the family Cosmopterigidae. It was described by Edward Meyrick in 1914. It is found in Pretoria, South Africa.

This species has a wingspan of 11–13 mm. The forewings are dark fuscous with a broad, pale, ochreous fascia near the base.

References

Endemic moths of South Africa
Moths described in 1914
Chrysopeleiinae
Moths of Africa